Mtron may refer to:
Lego_Space#M:Tron_.281990.E2.80.931991.29
Mtron (company), a former manufacturer of SSDs and other equipment